Nicol Paone (born March 11, 1971) is an American comedian, director, writer, and actress. She is bisexual.

Background
Nicol Paone is an alumna of the Groundlings Sunday Company. In addition to performing on The Big Gay Sketch Show, she has been on Punk'd, performed in many sketches for Funny or Die, and had a role in the 2009 film Funny People. Paone is also a member of the sketch comedy troupe The Deviants.

Paone wrote and directed the 2020 comedy film Friendsgiving.

References

External links
 
 Nicol Paone on Twitter (personal)
 Nicol Paone on Instagram (personal)

1971 births
Living people
21st-century American actresses
American sketch comedians
American stand-up comedians
American television actresses
American women comedians
21st-century American comedians
Actresses from New Jersey
LGBT people from New Jersey
Comedians from New Jersey
Film directors from New Jersey
American women film directors
American women screenwriters
Bisexual actresses
Bisexual comedians
American bisexual actors
American LGBT comedians